Pharsalia duplicata is a species of beetle in the family Cerambycidae. It was described by Francis Polkinghorne Pascoe in 1866. It is known from Malaysia, Borneo and Java.

References

duplicata
Beetles described in 1866